Gile Steele (24 September 1908, in Ohio – 16 January 1952, in Culver City, California), was a Hollywood costume designer. His career began at MGM in 1938 with one of his first assignments being the Norma Shearer film Marie Antoinette. He also worked on many of the company's prestige pictures including Pride and Prejudice and Boom Town (both 1940), Blossoms in the Dust and Dr. Jekyll and Mr. Hyde (both 1941), Mrs. Miniver (1942) and Madame Curie (1943). He was one of the first nominees when the category for Best Costume Design was introduced at the Academy Awards in 1948 for his work on The Emperor Waltz. He won the Oscar for The Heiress in 1949 and Samson and Delilah in 1950. He died abruptly in 1952 at the age of 43.

External links

American costume designers
1908 births
1952 deaths
Best Costume Design Academy Award winners
California people in fashion